Sea World is a large tourist attraction and mall in Shekou, Nanshan District, Shenzhen. Its main attraction is the large ship, Minghua, in the center of the mall. Inside the boat, there is a hotel. Surrounding the boat, there are many restaurants and hotels including Allatore, Laofangzi, Tequilla Coyotes, baia burger, as well as many other Chinese and Japanese Restaurants.

It includes the Sea World Culture and Arts Center.

There is also a statue of Nuwa.

Water show
During the night time, at 7 o'clock, there is a water fountain show. Music is played, with water sprayers synchronised to the music. In addition, there are lights and even fire, paid for by the Water Design Co Ltd., who invested over 30 million RMB for the project.

Restaurants

Restaurants of various cuisines are in the area, numbering more than forty as of 2011.

Transportation
Sea World station of the Shenzhen Metro services the area. Line 2 opened in 2010, putting the area on the subway system.

References

Tourist attractions in Shenzhen
Commercial buildings in Shenzhen
Nanshan District, Shenzhen